Rodney Stuart Young (born August 1, 1907, in Bernardsville, New Jersey, – died October 25, 1974, in Chester Springs, Pennsylvania) was an American Near Eastern archaeologist.  He is known for his excavation of the city of Gordium, capital of the ancient Phrygians and associated with the legendary king, Midas.

Young received an A.B. in Classics from Princeton University in 1929, and then an M.A. from Columbia University in 1932, written under the direction of William Dinsmoor, Sr. In 1940 Young earned his Ph.D. in classics and archaeology from Princeton University. He had excavated in the agora at Athens before becoming Curator of the Mediterranean Section of the University of Pennsylvania Museum of Archaeology and Anthropology and Professor of Classical Archaeology at the University of Pennsylvania in 1950, where he helped to build the graduate program known today as the Graduate Group in the Art and Archaeology of the Mediterranean World. He was elected to the American Philosophical Society in 1965. At the same juncture, Young began a series of new excavations at Gordium and continued as director until his untimely death in 1974. His major work on Phrygian tumuli - including the famed "Midas Mound" or Tumulus MM was published posthumously. After his death the leadership of the excavations eventually passed to his student, G. Kenneth Sams, now Professor of Classical Archaeology at the University of North Carolina at Chapel Hill.  Among the scholars who also worked on this excavation team was the archaeologist Theresa Howard Carter.

During World War II, Young volunteered in Greece as an ambulance driver, and was wounded on the Epirus front.  He received a Bronze Star from the United States and the Croix de Guerre from Greece for his service.

Young was active in his field, serving as president of the Archaeological Institute of America from 1968 to 1972 and was Charles Elliot Norton Lecturer in 1968/1969.  His professional interests concentrated on Greek and Phrygian archaeology, art, and history, the Early Iron Age, and early writing.  Young died in an automobile accident near his home in Chester Springs, Pennsylvania.

Bibliography
 Late geometric graves and a seventh century well in the Agora (1939).
 Gordion; a guide to the excavations and museum (1968).
Rodney S. Young; Keith DeVries; E. L. Kohler. Three great early tumuli. Philadelphia : University Museum, University of Pennsylvania, 1981. .

External links
 Gordion Excavation Project
Rodney S. Young Memorial Lectures
"Trowel, Cloak, and Dagger" The Pennsylvania Gazette November/December 2012
"Rodney Stuart Young—August 1, 1907-October 25, 1974" Archaeology Vol. 28, No. 2 (April 1975), p. 129

References

Young, Rodney S
Young, Rodney S
Young, Rodney S
Young, Rodney S
20th-century American archaeologists
Presidents of the Archaeological Institute of America
Members of the American Philosophical Society